Pinnickinnick Mountain is a summit in West Virginia, in the United States.

Pinnickinnick Mountain was named after a herb native to the area which was used to make tea.

References

Mountains of Harrison County, West Virginia
Mountains of West Virginia